Nils Herbert Kromann Nielsen (born 3 November 1971) is a Danish football manager. Since 14 November 2018, he is the head coach of the Switzerland women's national football team.

Nielsen is best known for his tenure with the Denmark women's national football team from 2013 to 2017. He led the Danes to a runners-up finish at the UEFA Women's Euro 2017. Despite departing the team shortly after, Nielsen received acclaim for his work and finished runner-up in the 2017 The Best FIFA Women's Coach award. He spent most of 2018 as the assistant manager of the China women's national under-20 football team, taking them to the 2018 FIFA U-20 Women's World Cup.

Biography 
Both of Nielsen's parents were teachers, and as it was his father's wish to live and work in Greenland, Nielsen was born there. During his first years, he lived in a village of 25 inhabitants. When he was five, his parents separated, and with his mother he moved back to Denmark while his father and his brother stayed in Maniitsoq. Born with a serious back problem, his doctor forbade him to play soccer. To compensate for his weakness, he chose large amounts of muscular strength exercises, and played soccer anyway. During a game, he fell onto the side fence, and broke a vertebra. With great luck, he avoided a paraplegia. After that accident, he stopped playing, and later chose a career as a trainer and studied sports psychology.

References

External links
Dansk Boldspil Union (DBU) 

1971 births
Living people
Danish football managers
Danish expatriate football managers
Denmark women's national football team managers
Switzerland women's national football team managers
Football people in Greenland
20th-century Greenlandic people
21st-century Greenlandic people
UEFA Women's Euro 2022 managers
Expatriate football managers in Switzerland
People from Nuuk
Greenlandic sports coaches
Danish expatriate sportspeople in China
Danish expatriate sportspeople in Switzerland
People from Ærø Municipality
Sportspeople from the Region of Southern Denmark